The 1994 Major League Baseball All-Star Game was the 65th playing of the midsummer classic between the all-stars of the American League (AL) and National League (NL), the two leagues comprising Major League Baseball. The game was held on July 12, 1994, at Three Rivers Stadium in Pittsburgh, Pennsylvania, the home of the Pittsburgh Pirates of the National League—tying the Indians for the all-time record of most All-Star Games hosted by one franchise, as the Pirates had also hosted in 1944, 1959, and 1974 (and would again in 2006). The game resulted in the National League defeating the American League 8–7 in 10 innings. It was the National League's first win since 1987.

This All-Star Game also marked the inaugural telecast for The Baseball Network, a joint-venture between Major League Baseball, ABC and NBC. This was NBC's first television broadcast of a Major League Baseball game since Game 5 of the 1989 National League Championship Series on October 9 of that year.

Rosters 
Players in italics have since been inducted into the National Baseball Hall of Fame.

American League

National League

Game

Umpires

Starting lineups

Game summary 

Cowboy Junkies lead singer Margo Timmins sang the Canadian National Anthem and rocker Meat Loaf the U.S. National Anthem.  Both were accompanied by the 1994–95 Penn State ROTC Color Guard.  Then, Willie Stargell threw out the ceremonial first pitch.  It was once said that "having Willie Stargell on your team is like having a diamond ring on your finger."

The AL got on the board quickly against starting pitcher Greg Maddux.  Boggs singled with one out and went to third on Griffey's double in the left center field gap.  Frank Thomas the hit a sinking line shot off the glove of Tony Gwynn in center which scored Boggs and moved Griffey to third.  But Maddux escaped the jam by stabbing Joe Carter's line drive up the middle and then throwing to first to double off Thomas who had taken off for second.  In the bottom of the first the NL got to starter Jimmy Key with a double into the left field corner by the Cardinals' Gregg Jeffries and a sac fly by Barry Bonds who was booed lustily by his former fans in Pittsburgh.

The NL, who had been dominated in the All Star Games the last 2 years, appeared to be pulling away in the third inning against that season's AL Cy Young Award winner David Cone (of the Royals).  Pinch hitter Jeff Bagwell hit a one-out single, Jeffries was hit by a pitch, and Tony Gwynn ripped a double into the right field corner scoring both runners (Jeffries just barely getting around the tag of catcher Pudge Rodriguez).  After Bonds struck out, the Dodgers' Mike Piazza hit a two-out single scoring Gwynn to increase the margin to 4–1.

The first-place Expos' Ken Hill kept the AL off the scoreboard for two innings.  However, in the 6th, the vaunted AL lineup broke through against Doug Drabek.  Roberto Alomar singled to center, stole second, and scored on a Griffey hit (his second RBI of the night).  Even though Griffey was tagged out in a rundown after his hit, the inning continued with a two-out rally.  Frank Thomas singled, then came around to score thanks to an errant throw from Matt Williams on a ground out by Joe Carter.  Carter then came home on a hit by the prior year's All-Star game MVP Kirby Puckett.

With the scored tied 4–4, the NL retaliated immediately the next half-inning when the Expos' Marquis Grissom sliced a home run down the right field line off Randy Johnson.  Later in the inning, with a runner on and one out, the Pittsburgh crowd roared but then exhaled when the slap-hitting veteran Ozzie Smith nearly hit another home run off the Big Unit – missing the left field foul pole by a few feet.

It all appeared to unravel for the NL in the 7th, clinging to their now slim one-run lead.  Astros closer John Hudek quickly gave up a single to Pudge and a walk to Mickey Tettleton.  Then the Twins' Chuck Knoblauch looked to have a sure single on the AstroTurf through the left side, but Ozzie Smith made a spectacular diving stop and fired to second for the force play.  The play, though, only temporarily halted the AL uprising as veteran Danny Jackson came in to relieve and got knocked around.  He allowed a run-scoring double by the Red Sox third baseman Scott Cooper and a 2-run single by the Indians' Kenny Lofton.

The NL looked to be running out of time thanks to scoreless innings by AL pitchers Pat Hentgen of the Blue Jays and Wilson Álvarez of the White Sox.  In the 9th the AL brought in veteran closer Lee Smith who had resurrected his dominant stuff one last time with the Orioles that season.  He quickly walked Marquis Grissom to lead off.  Then got Craig Biggio to hit a sharp grounder to third baseman Scott Cooper at third.  However, Cooper double clutched ever so slightly and the AL just missed turning the double play on Biggio.  This allowed Fregosi to pinch-hit slugger Fred McGriff, who he had saved up, to come to the plate as the tying run. The Crimedog promptly drove a Smith's splitter into the centerfield stands to tie up the game in dramatic fashion.

In the 10th the NL quickly went to work on AL reliever Jason Bere of the White Sox.  Gwynn chopped a single through the box with no one out.  The Expos' Moisés Alou then slammed a double that short-hopped the left center field wall.  Gwynn was waved all the way home from first base and slid just under Pudge Rodriguez's tag to end the game.

After the game, National League President Leonard S. Coleman Jr. made All-Star history by becoming the first African-American chief of any major league to preside over an MVP award presentation. He presented the award to Fred McGriff in lieu of the Commissioner of Baseball. This position was vacant and would not be filled until 1998 when Bud Selig, who had served as Chairman of the Executive Council since Fay Vincent's resignation in 1992, officially took the post.

WEEK-TV transmitter difficulties 
Peoria's NBC station WEEK-TV suffered misfortunes of significant transmitter difficulties throughout most of the game, forcing WEEK's signal to be knocked off the air until one hour after the conclusion.

The station would later air an abbreviated version of the game the following weekend due to its transmitter problems on NBC's live broadcast.

References

External links 
Baseball Almanac
Baseball-Reference.com

Major League Baseball All-Star Game
Major League Baseball All-Star Game
Baseball competitions in Pittsburgh
Major League Baseball All Star Game
July 1994 sports events in the United States
1990s in Pittsburgh
1994 in American sports